Blankenship Bend is a bend on the Colorado River in Mohave County, Arizona, US.

History
In the 19th century, Blankenship Bend formed a horseshoe shaped turn of the river of 180 degrees, that the steamboat men called the Grand Turn, because it was the largest turn on the Colorado River that was navigated by steamboats.

References 

Landforms of Mohave County, Arizona